The Willows was a rugby league stadium in Weaste, Salford, England. It had a final capacity of 11,363 with 2,500 seats.

History
They made their debut at the Willows on 21 December 1901, beating Swinton 2–0 in front of 16,981 fans.

In the 1960s, the terrace was flattened at the Willows Road end to make way for the Salford Football and Social Club which was officially opened on 16 June 1966.

The Willows switched on its floodlights for the first time in the match with Widnes on Friday 11 March 1966. On 26 November 1989, Salford unveiled a new £50,000 electronic scoreboard above the Willows Variety Centre.

Salford City Reds moved to the Salford City Stadium in Barton-upon-Irwell at the start of the 2012 season. The last match at the Willows saw them lose to the Catalans Dragons 18–44 in front of 10,146 fans, a record for a Salford City Reds home match in the Super League.

Redevelopment
In 2013, a proposal to redevelop the site for housing was put forward by City West Housing Trust.

Rugby League Test matches
List of international rugby league matches played at The Willows.

Rugby League Tour Matches
The Willows also saw Salford and the county team Lancashire play host to various international touring teams from 1908–1978.

References

External links
The Willows on Worldstadia.com
Directions to The Willows
Pictures of The Willows

Salford Red Devils
Defunct sports venues in Greater Manchester
Defunct rugby league venues in England
Rugby League World Cup stadiums
Sports venues in Salford
Demolished buildings and structures in Greater Manchester